Verónica Michelle Bachelet Jeria (born 29 September 1951) is a Chilean politician who served as United Nations High Commissioner for Human Rights from 2018 to 2022. She previously served as President of Chile from 2006 to 2010 and from 2014 to 2018 for the Socialist Party of Chile. She is the first woman to hold the Chilean presidency. After leaving the presidency in 2010 and before becoming eligible for re-election, she was appointed as the first executive director of the newly established United Nations Entity for Gender Equality and the Empowerment of Women. In December 2013, Bachelet was re-elected with over 62% of the vote, surpassing the 54% she received in 2006. She was the first President of Chile to be re-elected since 1932.

Bachelet, a physician who has studied military strategy at the university level, previously served as the Health Minister and Defense Minister under her predecessor, Ricardo Lagos. She is a separated mother of three and identifies as an agnostic. She speaks English fluently and has some proficiency in German, French, and Portuguese.

Family background
Bachelet is the second child of archaeologist Ángela Jeria Gómez (1926–2020) and Air Force Brigadier General Alberto Bachelet Martínez (1923–1974).

Bachelet's paternal great-great-grandfather, Louis-Joseph Bachelet Lapierre (1820–1864), was a French wine merchant from Chassagne-Montrachet who immigrated to Chile with his Parisian wife, Françoise Jeanne Beault, in 1860. He was hired as a wine-making expert by the Subercaseaux vineyards in Santiago. Bachelet Lapierre's son, Germán, was born in Santiago in 1862 and, in 1891, married Luisa Brandt Cadot, a Chilean of French and Swiss descent. They gave birth to Alberto Bachelet Brandt in 1894.

Bachelet's maternal great-grandfather, Máximo Jeria Chacón, of Spanish (Basque region) and Greek heritage, was the first person to receive a degree in agronomic engineering in Chile. He founded several agronomy schools in the country and married Lely Johnson, the daughter of an English physician working in Chile. Their son, Máximo Jeria Johnson, married Ángela Gómez Zamora and had five children, with Bachelet's mother being the fourth.

Early life and career

Childhood years 
Bachelet was born in La Cisterna, a middle-class suburb of Santiago. She was named after French actress Michèle Morgan. Bachelet spent many of her childhood years traveling around her native Chile, moving with her family from one military base to another. She lived and attended primary schools in, among other places, Quintero, Antofagasta, and San Bernardo. In 1962, she moved with her family to the United States, where her father was assigned to the military mission at the Chilean Embassy in Washington D.C. Her family lived for almost two years in Bethesda, Maryland, where she attended Western Junior High School and learned to speak English fluently.

Returning to Chile in 1964, she graduated in 1969 from Liceo Nº 1 Javiera Carrera, a prestigious girls' public high school, finishing near the top of her class. There she was class president, a member of the choir and volleyball teams, and part of a theater group and a band, "Las Clap Clap," which she co-founded and which toured around several school festivals. In 1970, after obtaining a relatively high score on the university admission test, she entered medical school at the University of Chile, where she was selected in the 113th position (out of 160 admitted applicants). She originally intended to study sociology or economics, but was prevailed upon by her father to study medicine instead. She has said she opted for medicine because it was 'a concrete way of helping people cope with pain' and 'a way to contribute to improve health in Chile.'

Detention and exile
Facing growing food shortages, the government of Salvador Allende placed Bachelet's father in charge of the Food Distribution Office. When General Augusto Pinochet suddenly came to power via the 11 September 1973 coup d'état, Bachelet's father was detained at the Air War Academy on charges of treason. Following months of daily torture at Santiago's Public Prison, he suffered a cardiac arrest that resulted in his death on 12 March 1974. In early January 1975, Bachelet and her mother were detained at their apartment by two DINA agents, who blindfolded them and drove them to Villa Grimaldi, a notorious secret detention center in Santiago, where they were separated and subjected to interrogation and torture.

In 2013, Bachelet revealed she had been interrogated by DINA chief Manuel Contreras there. Some days later, Bachelet was transferred to Cuatro Álamos ("Four Poplars") detention center, where she was held until the end of January. Thanks to the assistance of Roberto Kozak, Bachelet was able to go into exile in Australia, where her older brother, Alberto, had moved in 1969.

Of her torture, Bachelet said, in 2004, that "it was nothing in comparison to what others suffered". She was "yelled at using abusive language, shaken," and both she and her mother were "threatened with the killing of the other." She was "never tortured with electricity," but she did see it done to other prisoners.

In May 1975, Bachelet left Australia and later relocated to East Germany, where she was assigned an apartment in Am Stern, Potsdam by the German Democratic Republic (GDR). Her mother joined her a month later and lived separately in Leipzig. In October 1976, Bachelet began working at a communal clinic in the Babelsberg neighborhood as a stepping stone to furthering her medical studies at a university in East Germany. During this time, she met architect Jorge Leopoldo Dávalos Cartes, another Chilean exile, and they married in 1977. In January 1978, Bachelet went to Leipzig to study German at the Herder Institute of Karl Marx University (now the University of Leipzig). She gave birth to her first child with Dávalos, Jorge Alberto Sebastián, in June 1978. She returned to Potsdam in September 1978 to continue her medical studies at the Humboldt University of Berlin for two years. Five months after enrolling as a student, however, she obtained authorization to return to her country.

Return to Chile
After four years in exile, Bachelet returned to Chile in 1979. Her medical school credits from the GDR were not recognized, so she had to restart her studies where she left off before she fled the country.  Despite this setback, she graduated as physician-surgeon on January 7, 1983. Bachelet wanted to work in the public sector where she could make the most impact, but her request to work as a general practitioner was denied by the military government on "political grounds".

However, Bachelet's academic achievements and published papers earned her a scholarship from the Chilean Medical Chamber to specialize in pediatrics and public health at the Roberto del Río Children's Hospital at the University of Chile' (1983–86). She completed the program with excellent grades but did not receive her certification for "financial reasons."

During this time, Bachelet also worked at PIDEE (Protection of Children Injured by States of Emergency Foundation), a non-governmental organization that provided support for the children of the missing and the tortured in Santiago and Chillán. She served as the head of the Medical Department of the foundation from 1986 and 1990. Some time after the birth of her second child with Dávalos, Francisca Valentina, in February 1984, she and her husband legally separated. Between 1985 and 1987, Bachelet had a romantic relationship with Alex Vojkovic Trier, an engineer and spokesman for the Manuel Rodríguez Patriotic Front, an armed group that, among other actions, attempted to assassinate Pinochet in 1986. The affair was a minor issue during her presidential campaign, during which she stated that she never supported any of Vojkovic's activities.

After Chile's transition to democracy in 1990, Bachelet worked for the Ministry of Health's West Santiago Health Service and served as a consultant for the Pan-American Health Organization, the World Health Organization, and the Deutsche Gesellschaft für Technische Zusammenarbeit. While working for the National AIDS Commission (Conasida), she became romantically involved with Aníbal Hernán Henríquez Marich, a fellow physician and a right-wing supporter of Pinochet, who fathered her third child, Sofía Catalina, in December 1992. Their relationship ended a few years later. From March 1994 and July 1997, Bachelet worked as Senior Assistant to the Deputy Health Minister. Driven by an interest in civil-military relations, Bachelet began studying military strategy at the National Academy of Political and Strategic Studies (ANEPE) in Chile in 1996, earning first place in her class. This achievement earned her a presidential scholarship, allowing her to continue her studies in the United States at the Inter-American Defense College in Washington, D.C., where she completed a Continental Defense Course in 1998. That same year she returned to Chile to work for the Defense Ministry as the Senior Assistant to the Defense Minister and went on to graduate from a Master's program in military science at the Chilean Army's War Academy.

Early political career

Involvement in politics
In 1970, during her first year as a university student, Bachelet joined the Socialist Youth and was an active supporter of the Popular Unity. In the immediate aftermath of the coup, she and her mother worked as couriers for the underground Socialist Party directorate, which was trying to organize a resistance movement. Eventually, almost all of them were captured and disappeared.

In the second half of the 1980s, Bachelet, after her return from exile, became politically active, fighting for the restoration of democracy in Chile, although not on the front line. In 1995, she became a member of the party's Central Committee and, from 1998 to 2000, she was an active member of the Political Commission. In 1996, she ran against future presidential opponent Joaquín Lavín for the mayorship of Las Condes, a wealthy suburb of Santiago and a right-wing stronghold. Lavín won the 22-candidate election with nearly 78% of the vote, while Bachelet finished fourth with 2.35%. At the 1999 presidential primary of the Concertación, Chile's governing coalition from 1990 to 2010, Bachelet worked for the nomination of Ricardo Lagos, heading the Santiago electoral zone.

Minister of Health

On March 11, 2000, virtually unknown at the time, Bachelet was appointed Minister of Health by President Ricardo Lagos. She conducted an in-depth study of the public healthcare system which resulted in the creation of the AUGE plan a few years later. During her tenure, she was given the challenging task of eliminating the waiting lists in the overburdened public hospital system within the first 100 days of Lagos's government. Although she was successful in reducing the waiting lists by 90%, she was unable to completely eliminate them and offered her resignation, which was promptly rejected by the President. Bachelet authorized the free distribution of the morning-after pill for victims of sexual abuse, which sparked controversy.

Minister of National Defense
On January 7, 2002, Bachelet was appointed Minister of National Defense, becoming the first woman in a Latin American country and one of the few in the world to hold this position. As Minister of Defense, she fostered reconciliatory gestures between the military and victims of the dictatorship, leading to General Juan Emilio Cheyre, head of the army, making a historic declaration in 2003 that the military would "never again" subvert democracy in Chile. Additionally, she oversaw reforms of the military pension system and continued with the modernization process of the Chilean armed forces, including purchasing of new military equipment and participating in international peace operations. One key moment that has been cited as a factor in Bachelet's chances to the presidency occurred in mid-2002, during a flood in northern Santiago. As Defense Minister, she led a rescue operation while wearing a cloak and military cap, perched atop an amphibious tank.

2005–2006 presidential election

By the end of 2004, Bachelet's surging popularity in opinion polls made her the only politician within the Coalition of Parties for Democracy (Concertación de los Partidos por la Democracia; CPD) who was capable of defeating Joaquín Lavín in the presidential election. As a result, she was chosen as the Socialist Party's candidate for the presidency. Initially hesitant to accept the nomination, as it was never a goal of hers, she eventually agreed as she felt she could not let her supporters down. On 1 October of that year, she stepped down from her government position to fully focus on her campaign and to support the CPD in the municipal elections held later that month. On January 28, 2005, she was officially named the Socialist Party's presidential candidate. An open primary was scheduled for July 2005 to determine the CPD's sole presidential candidate, but it was canceled after Bachelet's only rival, Christian Democrat Soledad Alvear, a cabinet member in the first three CPD administrations, withdrew early due to a lack of support within her own party and in opinion polls.

In the December 2005 election, Bachelet ran against three candidates: Sebastián Piñera from the center-right (RN), Joaquín Lavín from the right-wing (UDI), and Tomás Hirsch from the left (JPM). As predicted by opinion polls, she didn't receive the absolute majority needed to win the election outright, obtaining 46% of the vote. On 15 January 2006, she went on to face Piñera in the runoff election and won the presidency with 53.5% of the vote, becoming Chile's first female president and the first woman in Latin America to reach the presidency through a direct election without being the wife of a previous head of state or political leader.

On 30 January 2006, Bachelet was declared President-elect by the Elections Certification Court (Tricel) and announced her cabinet, which, for the first time, was composed of an equal number of men and women, as promised during her campaign. To reflect the balance of power within the Coalition, Bachelet named seven ministers from the Christian Democrat Party (PDC), five from the Party for Democracy (PPD), four from the Socialist Party (PS), one from the Social Democrat Radical Party (PRSD), and three without party affiliation.

First presidency (2006–2010)

First days
Bachelet was sworn in as President of the Republic of Chile on 11 March 2006 in a ceremony held in a plenary session of the National Congress in Valparaíso attended by many foreign heads of states and delegates. Much of Bachelet's first three months as president were spent working on 36 measures she had promised during her campaign to implement during her first 100 days in office. They ranged from simple presidential decrees, such as providing free health care for older patients, to complex bills to reform the social security system and the electoral system. For her first state visit, Bachelet chose Argentina, arriving in Buenos Aires on 21 March. There she met with president Néstor Kirchner, with whom she signed strategic agreements on energy and infrastructure, including the possibility of launching a bidding process to operate the Transandine Railway.

Domestic affairs

Social policies
In March 2006 Bachelet created an advisory committee to reform the pension system, which was headed by former budget director Mario Marcel. The commission issued its final report in July 2006, and in March 2008 Bachelet signed the bill into law. The new legislation established a Basic Solidarity Pension (PBS) and a Solidarity Pension Contribution (APS), guaranteeing a minimum pension for the 60% poorest segment of the population, regardless of their contribution history. The reform also grants a bonus to female pensioners for every child born alive.

In October 2006 Bachelet enacted legislation to protect subcontracted employees, which would benefit an estimated 1.2 million workers. In June 2009 she introduced pay equality legislation, guaranteeing equal pay for equal work in the private sector, regardless of gender.

In September 2009 Bachelet signed the "Chile Grows with You" plan into law, providing comprehensive social services to vulnerable children from ages zero to six. That law also established a social welfare management framework called the "Intersectoral Social Protection System", made up of subsystems such as "Chile Solidario" and "Chile Grows with You".

Between 2008 and 2010 the Bachelet administration delivered a so-called "literary briefcase" (a box of books including encyclopedias, dictionaries, poetry works and books for both children and adults) to the 400,000 poorest families with children attending primary school from first to fourth grade.

In March 2009, Bachelet launched the "I Choose my PC" program, awarding free computers to poor seventh-graders with excellent academic performance attending government-subsidized schools. During 2009 and 2010 Bachelet delivered maternity packages to all babies born in public hospitals, which are about 80% of total births. In January 2010, Bachelet promulgated a law allowing the distribution of emergency contraception pills in public and private health centers, including to persons under 14, without parental consent. The law also requires high schools to add a sexual education program to their curriculum.

Student protests
Bachelet's first political crisis came in late April 2006, when massive high school student demonstrations – unseen in three decades – broke out throughout the country, demanding better public education. In June 2006, she sought to dampen the student protests by setting up an 81-member advisory committee, including education experts from all political backgrounds, representatives of ethnic groups, parents, teachers, students, school owners, university rectors, people from diverse religious denominations, etc. Its purpose was to propose changes to the country's educational system and serve as a forum to share ideas and views. The committee issued its final report in December 2006. In August 2009, she signed the education reform bill into law, which created two new regulatory bodies: a Superintendency on Education and a Quality Agency.

Transantiago fiasco
During her presidency Bachelet opened 18 new subway stations in Santiago, nine in 2006, one in 2009 and eight in 2010. In December 2009 Bachelet announced the construction of a new subway line in Santiago, to be operational by 2014 (the date was later changed to mid-2016).

In February 2007 Santiago's transport system was radically altered with the introduction of Transantiago, designed under the previous administration. The system was nearly unanimously condemned by the media, the users and the opposition, significantly damaging her popularity, and leading to the sacking of her Transport minister. On her decision not to abort the plan's start, she said in April 2007 she was given erroneous information which caused her to act against her "instincts."

In September 2008, Chile's Constitutional Court declared a US$400 million loan by the Inter-American Development Bank to fund the transport system unconstitutional. Bachelet – who had been forced to ask for the loan after Congress had refused to approve funds for the beleaguered program in November 2007 – made use of an emergency clause in the Constitution that grants funds equivalent to 2% of the fiscal budget. In November 2008, she invoked the emergency clause again after Congress denied once again funds for the system for 2009.

2010 earthquake
On February 27, 2010, during the last week of summer vacations and less than two weeks before Bachelet's term was set to expire, Chile was struck by an 8.8-magnitude earthquake that killed over 500 people and caused widespread damage, including the collapse of apartment buildings and bridges and tsunamis that destroyed fishing villages. Bachelet and the government faced criticism for their slow response to the disaster, which hit on a Saturday at 3:34 am and left most of the country without electricity, phone, and Internet access. Bachelet declared a state of catastrophe and, on Sunday afternoon, sent military troops to the most affected areas in an effort to quell instances of looting and arson. She also imposed night curfews in the most affected cities, but was criticized for not deploying the troops quickly enough.

Human rights

In January 2009 Bachelet opened the Museum of Memory and Human Rights in Santiago, documenting the horrors of Pinochet's 16-and-a-half-year dictatorship. In November she promulgated a law (submitted to Congress during the previous administration) creating the National Institute for Human Rights, with the goal of protecting and promoting human rights in the country. The law also allowed for the reopening of the Rettig and Valech commissions for 18 months. She used her power as president to send a bill to legalize gay marriages, and sponsored a reproductive rights bill,

On 10 August 2018 the outgoing UN High Commissioner for Human Rights Zeid Ra’ad Al Hussein warmly welcomed the UN General Assembly's appointment of Michelle Bachelet to succeed him. He said that "She has all the attributes – courage, perseverance, passion, and a deep commitment to human rights"

Other legislation passed
In August 2008, Bachelet signed a freedom of information bill into law, which became effective in April 2009.

In January 2010, Bachelet enacted a law creating the Ministry for the Environment. The new legislation also created the Environmental Evaluation Service and the Superintendency for the Environment.

Half of the ministries in her first government were occupied by women; in her successor's team, Sebastián Piñera, 18% were.

Economy
Bachelet was widely credited for resisting calls from politicians within her own coalition to spend the country's huge copper revenues to close the income gap. Instead in 2007 she created the Economic and Social Stabilization Fund, a sovereign wealth fund which accumulates fiscal surpluses above 1% of GDP. This allowed her to finance new social policies and provide economic stimulus packages when the 2008 financial crisis hit the country.

During her four years in office, the economy grew at an average rate of 3.3% per year (2.3% on per capita basis), reaching a high of 5.7% in 2006 and a low of −1.0% in 2009 due to the global financial crisis. The real minimum wage increased an average of 2% per year, the lowest increase of any president since 1990, while unemployment hovered between 7 and 8% for the first three years, then rose to nearly 11% during 2009. Inflation averaged 4.5% per year, reaching close to 9% in 2008 due to rising food prices. Absolute poverty fell from 13.7% in November 2006 to 11.5% in November 2009.

Political issues
Bachelet began her term with an unprecedented absolute majority in both chambers of Congress. Prior to the elimination of appointed senators in the 2005 constitutional reforms, the CPD had never held a majority in the Senate. However, she was soon met with internal opposition from several discontented lawmakers in both chambers of Congress, known as díscolos ("disobedient", "ungovernable"). This opposition jeopardized the coalition's fragile and historic congressional majority on a number of key executive-sponsored bills during much of her first two years in office and forced Bachelet to negotiate with a right-wing opposition that she perceived as "obstructionist." By 2007, the CPD had lost its absolute majority in both chambers of Congress as several senators and deputies from the coalition became independent.

In December 2006, Pinochet died. Bachelet decided not to grant him a state funeral, an honour bestowed upon constitutionally elected Chilean presidents, but a military funeral as former commander-in-chief of the Army appointed by President Salvador Allende. She also refused to declare an official national day of mourning, but did authorize flags at military barracks to fly at half staff. Pinochet's coffin was also allowed to be draped in a Chilean flag. Bachelet did not attend his funeral, saying it would be "a violation of [her] conscience," and sent Defense Minister Vivianne Blanlot instead.

In April 2008, Bachelet's Education Minister, Yasna Provoste, was impeached by Congress for her handling of a scandal involving mismanagement of school subsidies. Her conviction was the first for a sitting minister in 36 years.

Foreign relations

Argentina
During her first year in office Bachelet faced continuing problems from neighbors Argentina and Peru. In July 2006 she sent a letter of protest to Argentine president Néstor Kirchner after his government issued a decree increasing export tariffs on natural gas to Chile, which was considered by Bachelet to be a violation of a tacit bilateral agreement. A month later a long-standing border dispute resurfaced after Argentina published some tourist maps showing contested territory in the south – the Southern Patagonian Ice Field (Campo de Hielo Patagónico Sur) – as Argentine, violating an agreement not to define a border over the area.

Peru
In early 2007, Peru accused Chile of unilaterally redefining their shared sea boundary in a section of a law passed by Congress that detailed the borders of the new administrative region of Arica and Parinacota. The impasse was resolved by the Chilean Constitutional Tribunal, which declared that section unconstitutional. In March 2007, the Chilean state-owned and independent public broadcaster Televisión Nacional de Chile (TVN) canceled the broadcast of a documentary about the War of the Pacific after a cautionary call was made to the stations’ board of directors by Chilean Foreign Relations Minister Alejandro Foxley, apparently acting on demands made by the Peruvian ambassador to Chile; the show was finally broadcast in late May of that year. In August 2007 the Chilean government filed a formal diplomatic protest with Peru and summoned home its ambassador after Peru published an official map claiming a part of the Pacific Ocean that Chile considers its sovereign territory. Peru said this was just another step in its plans to bring the dispute to the International Court of Justice in The Hague. In January 2008 Peru asked the court to consider the dispute, prompting Bachelet to summon home the Chilean ambassador in Lima for consultations.

UN voting deadlock
The United Nations Security Council election held on October 16, 2006, which saw a deadlock between Venezuela and Guatemala for the two-year, non-permanent Latin American and Caribbean seat on the Security Council, developed into a significant ideological issue in Chile and was viewed as a test for Bachelet. The governing coalition was split, with the Socialists supporting Venezuela's bid and the Christian Democrats strongly opposing it. The day before the vote, the president announced through her spokesman that Chile would abstain, citing the lack of regional consensus on a single candidate, ending months of speculation. In March 2007, Chile's ambassador to Venezuela, Claudio Huepe, revealed in an interview with teleSUR that Bachelet personally told him that she had initially intended to vote for Venezuela but then "there were a series of circumstances that forced me to abstain." The government quickly recalled Huepe and accepted his resignation.

Unasur
In May 2008, Bachelet became the first President pro tempore of the Union of South American Nations (Unasur) and in September she called for an urgent summit after Bolivian President Evo Morales warned of a possible coup attempt against him. The presidents of Bolivia, Ecuador, Uruguay, Argentina, Paraguay, Brazil and Colombia, and the Secretary-General of the Organization of American States, met with Bachelet at the La Moneda Palace in Santiago, where they agreed to send two commissions to Bolivia: one to mediate between the executive and the opposition, and another to investigate the killings in Pando Department.

Cuba visit
In February 2009, Bachelet visited Cuba and met with Fidel Castro. There she urged the United States to put an end to the embargo. No Chilean head of state had visited the country in 37 years. Soon after the meeting, Castro wrote that the "fascist and vengeful Chilean oligarchy is the same which more than 100 years ago robbed Bolivia of its access to the Pacific and of copper-rich lands in a humiliating war."

Progressive Leaders summit
In March 2009, Bachelet hosted in Viña del Mar the "Progressive Leaders Summit", meeting with U.S. Vice President Joe Biden, British Prime Minister Gordon Brown, Spanish Prime Minister José Luis Rodríguez Zapatero and presidents Tabaré Vázquez of Uruguay, Luiz Inacio Lula da Silva of Brazil and Cristina Fernández de Kirchner of Argentina. The meeting garnered some media interest because it took place six days before the highly anticipated G-20 Summit in London.

Trade
Continuing the coalition's free-trade strategy, in August 2006 Bachelet promulgated a free trade agreement with the People's Republic of China (signed under the previous administration of Ricardo Lagos), the first Chinese free-trade agreement with a Latin American nation; similar deals with Japan and India were promulgated in August 2007. In October 2006, Bachelet promulgated a multilateral trade deal with New Zealand, Singapore and Brunei, the Trans-Pacific Strategic Economic Partnership (P4), also signed under Lagos's presidency. She held free-trade talks with other countries, including Australia, Vietnam, Turkey and Malaysia. Regionally, she signed bilateral free trade agreements with Panama, Peru and Colombia.

Other policies
In October 2007, Bachelet granted amnesty to undocumented migrants from other Latin American countries. The measure was expected to benefit around 15,000 Peruvians and 2,000 Bolivians. In December 2007 she signed in Bolivia a trilateral agreement with the presidents of Brazil and Bolivia to complete and improve a 4,700 km road to connect the Atlantic and Pacific Oceans, via Arica and Iquique in Chile and Santos in Brazil. In May 2008, following months of intense lobbying, Chile was elected as member of the United Nations Human Rights Council, obtaining the largest vote among Latin American countries.

In December 2009 Chile became the first country in South America, and the second in Latin America after Mexico, to receive an invitation to join the Organisation for Economic Co-operation and Development (OECD). Bachelet signed the accession agreement in January 2010, but it formally became a member in May 2010, after she had left office.

Popularity

Bachelet enjoyed an approval rating above 50% for her first three months in office, during the so-called "honeymoon period". Her popularity fell during the student protests that year, hovering in the mid-40s. In July she had a disastrous public relations incident when a group of residents she was visiting in the southern city of Chiguayante who were affected by a landslide berated her publicly on television, accusing her of using their tragedy to boost her falling popularity. One woman demanded that she leave the scene so rescue efforts could continue. In July, after only four months in office, Bachelet was forced to reshuffle her cabinet, in what was the fastest ministerial adjustment since 1990.

Bachelet's popularity dipped further in her second year, reaching a low of 35% approval, 46% disapproval in September 2007. This fall was mainly attributed to the Transantiago fiasco. That same month she had a second negative incident when a group of earthquake and tsunami victims she was visiting in the southern region of Aisén received her bearing black flags and accused her of showing up late. The city mayor, who told Bachelet to "go to hell", later apologized. Over the following 12 months, however, Bachelet's approval ratings did not improve.

At the onset of the global financial crisis in September 2008 Bachelet's popularity was at 42%, but gradually her job approval ratings began to rise. When she left office in March 2010 her popular support was at a record 84%, according to conservative polling institute Adimark GfK.

The Chilean Constitution does not allow a president to serve two consecutive terms and Bachelet endorsed Christian Democratic Party candidate Eduardo Frei Ruiz-Tagle for the December 2009 election.

Political interregnum
In April 2010, Bachelet inaugurated her own think-tank, "Fundación Dialoga". Its headquarters are located in Providencia, a suburb of Santiago.

Bachelet is a member of the Club of Madrid, the world's largest forum of former heads of state and government. Since 2010 she has also been a member of the Inter-American Dialogue, the leading think tank on Western Hemisphere relations and affairs, and served as the organization's co-chair.

On 14 September 2010, Bachelet was appointed head of the newly created United Nations body UN Women by UN Secretary-General Ban Ki-moon. She took office on 19 September 2010. On 15 March 2013 she announced her resignation.

2013 presidential election
On 27 March 2013, Bachelet announced that she would seek a second term as President of Chile in the 2013 elections. The well-respected CEP released a poll in May 2012 suggesting that 51% of voters wished to see her become the next president, far ahead of any other would-be candidate.

On 30 June 2013, Bachelet became the Nueva Mayoría's candidate for president after she won a four-way primary election with the support of five center and left parties (PS, PPD, PC, IC, MAS) and 73% of the vote.

In the 17 November 2013 presidential election, Bachelet fell short of the absolute majority needed for an outright win. In the runoff election, held on 15 December of that year, she beat former senator and Minister of Labor Evelyn Matthei with over 62% of the vote; turnout was significantly lower than in the first round.

Second presidency (2014–2018)

Bachelet was sworn in as President of the Republic of Chile for her second term on March 11, 2014, at the National Congress in Valparaíso. Isabel Allende, the daughter of former President Salvador Allende and newly elected President of the Senate, administered the affirmation of office to Bachelet, marking the first time in the country's history that both parties involved were women.

Domestic policies

Education reform
Among Bachelet's main campaign promises for the 2013 election was the introduction of free university education in Chile and the end of profit-making educational institutions, as a response to the 2011–13 Chilean student protests. The intention was that revenue from the increase in corporate tax rate by 2017 would be used to fund free education. The proposals were criticized and quickly became unpopular due to the opposition from students who felt that the proposals did not go far enough in removing profit making. Opposition parties, lower middle class voters and certain members of Bachelet's New Majority coalition attacked the proposals as the law that would prevent individuals from earning profits on public resources would not address making improvements in quality of education.

In 2015, the Chile Constitutional Court rejected large portions of Bachelet's plan to offer free college education to half of the nation's poorest students on grounds that requiring them to attend certain schools participating in the program could be considered discrimination. However, what remained of the plan allowed Bachelet to send 200,000 students from low-income families to college free of cost.

In January 2018, the Chilean Senate passed a law guaranteeing free education which was supported by conservative opposition parties as well, allowing the poorest 60% of students to study for free and doubled state funding for public universities. The new legislation created a higher education Superintendent empowered to supervise and penalize institutions which do not provide quality of education or have for-profit operations.

Tax reform
In September 2014, the Chilean Congress passed Bachelet's tax reform proposal which aimed to increase revenue by 3% of gross domestic product. Measures included in the reform were:
 increased corporate tax rate from 20% to 25% or 27%
 the maximum tax bracket for personal income tax lowered to 35 percent from 40 percent starting in 2018
 increased excise taxes for sweetened beverages, alcohol and tobacco
 "Green" taxes including a tax on carbon emissions for thermoelectric plants bigger than 50 MW and a tax on the import of diesel vehicles with higher cylinder capacity, excluding work vehicles
 measures against tax evasion

Critics blamed tax reforms for complexity driving away investment and for the slowdown of the Chilean economy during Bachelet's second period in office. However, Bachelet's supporters argue that falling copper prices were more to blame for the economic slowdown. They argue that economic forecasts of faster growth in conjunction with rising copper prices and exports from 2018 onwards (after Bachelet's term) suggest that the tax reforms did not negatively affect the economy. Others, such as MIT-trained economist and academic Klaus Schmidt-Hebbel, have found that Chile's overall terms of trade under Bachelet's second term worsened only marginally compared to those of her predecessor Sebastián Piñera, due in part to a lower cost of key imports like petroleum. Consequently, he concludes that Bachelet's reforms and governance likely were instrumental in causing a period of dampened growth throughout her presidency.

Environmental policy
After Easter Island's Rapa Nui inhabitants voted 73% in favor of establishing a conservation zone, Michelle Bachelet designated a new 720,000 square kilometer protection area in September 2017, protecting at least 142 endemic marine species, including 27 threatened with extinction. Five new national parks in the Patagonia region were created under a presidential decree, covering 10 million acres in January 2018, including 1 million acres of land contributed by conservationist Kris Tompkins. On 9 March 2018, Bachelet created nine marine reserves to protect biodiversity with her final presidential decree, increasing the area of the sea under state protection from 4.2 percent to 42.4 percent. The measure is expected to benefit marine life in approximately 1.4 million square kilometers.

Civil unions and same-sex marriage
When Michelle Bachelet again took office of President in March 2014, she made passing Piñera's civil union bill a priority.
The name of the bill was changed to Civil Union Pact (Pacto de Unión Civil) on 17 December, and Congress reiterated their intention to hold the final vote by January 2015. On 6 January 2015, a provision recognizing foreign marriages as civil unions was approved in the Constitutional Committee while the child adoption clause was turned down. The bill went to a final vote before both the Senate and the Chamber of Deputies as it was amended. On 13 January, the full Chamber of Deputies reinserted the adoption provision. On 20 January 2015, the Chamber approved the bill on a vote of 86 to 23 with 2 abstentions. On 27 January, the Senate rejected all the Chamber's amendments, so the bill was headed to the joint committee of both houses. The committee reached the agreement in regard to the text of the bill and changed its name to Civil Union Agreement (Acuerdo de Unión Civil) the same day. The bill was passed in both houses on 28 January 2015. Several lawmakers asked the Chilean Constitutional Court to verify the bill's constitutionality, which was upheld by the court in a ruling released on 6 April 2015. The bill was signed into law by President Bachelet on 13 April 2015. It was published in the Official Gazette on 21 April 2015 and took effect on 22 October 2015.

Chile's civil union provisions enable couples to claim pension benefits and inherit property if their civil partner dies as well as more easily co-own property and make medical decisions for one another. The Government estimated at the time of the law going into effect that some two million Chilean couples cohabiting could have their unions legally recognized. In the day following the law going into effect, approximately 1,600 couples signed up to register their unions.

On 1 December 2016, the Chamber of Deputies unanimously approved (except for 6 abstentions) a bill to give couples who enter in a civil union five days off, like what married couples have. The bill was approved by the Senate in October 2017, in a unanimous 15–0 vote.

Women's rights and abortion

A new Ministry for Women and Gender Inequality was formed, replacing the National Women's Service in June 2016 which aimed to formulate policies against abuse of women and gender inequality. Claudia Pascual was appointed as the first ever Minister for Women and Gender Inequality.

The Chilean Congress approved Bachelet's abortion legalization bill in some circumstances in July 2017, but was subjected to challenge in the Constitutional Court.
Later, Chile's total abortion ban implemented under the Pinochet regime in 1989 was lifted in August 2017 after the Constitutional Court voted 6–4 to allow the procedure under some circumstances: in cases of pregnancy as a result of rape (up to 12 weeks), if the fetus endangers the mother's life, or if the fetus is not viable. Prior to this, Chile was one of only four nations in the Americas that had a total ban on abortions, the others being El Salvador, Nicaragua and the Dominican Republic.

Constitutional and political reform
The Chilean Congress passed Bachelet's proposed abolishment of the binomial voting system introduced by the Augusto Pinochet regime and restoring proportional representation for election to both chambers of the Chilean Congress and requirements that 40% of candidates nominated are female in January 2015. The new system took effect from the 2017 elections, increasing the members of the Chamber of Deputies from 120 to 155 seats and the Senate from 38 seats to 43 seats in 2017 and 50 seats in 2021. As a result, the 2017 election saw the end of the dominance of Bachelet's New Majority and conservative coalitions and increased number of new political parties represented in Congress.

Following revelations that President Bachelet's son and daughter in-law were caught in an influence-peddling scandal, she appointed a Presidential Advisory Council on Conflicts of Interest, Influence Peddling, and Corruption (known as the Engel Commission) headed by economist Eduardo Engel. Subsequently, reforms recommended by the commission were implemented which included, ability to remove politicians from office if found guilty for transparency and election spending limits violations with disqualification for two subsequent elections and constitutional autonomy to Chile's electoral service (SERVEL), giving it complete independence from the government to more effectively oversee electoral processes and the functioning of politics in general.

In 2016, overseas voting rights for Chilean women and men living outside the country were introduced, allowing Chilean citizens who live abroad to exercise their right to vote beginning from the 2017 elections.

Foreign policy

Trade

On 8 March 2018, three days before Bachelet left office, the Comprehensive and Progressive Agreement for Trans-Pacific Partnership (CPTPP) multilateral trade agreement was signed in Santiago with Chile and 10 other signatory countries in the Asia Pacific region, following renegotiation of the original Trans-Pacific Partnership (TPP) which was signed in February 2016. The TPP was renegotiated into the CPTPP following the United States' withdrawal from the original TPP in January 2017.

Popularity
In September 2015, Bachelet's approval rating was 24%, compared to 72% disapproval. Chileans' support for her dropped sharply after revelations of corruption scandals such as the Caval scandal, which involved her son and daughter-in-law accepting millions of dollars in the form of a loan from vice-chairman of the Banco de Chile Andrónico Luksic Craig. The couple's company (Caval) used the money to purchase land and resell it at a $5 million profit after repaying the loan. Bachelet maintains that she was unaware of her family's actions and found out about the agreement between Luksic and her daughter-in-law through the press. By August 2016, Bachelet's approval rating dropped to 15%, the lowest for any President since the return of free elections in 1990, and in March 2017, Bachelet's approval rating remained low, at about 23%.

Bachelet left office in March 2018 with an approval rating at 39% according to Adimark, in contrast to the 84% rating when she left office in 2010.

UN High Commissioner for Human Rights (2018–2022)

On 10 September 2018, Bachelet urged China to allow observers into Xinjiang and expressed concern about the situation there. She said that: "The UN rights group had shown that Uyghurs and other Muslims are being detained in camps across Xinjiang and I expect discussions with Chinese officials to begin soon". China called for Bachelet to respect its sovereignty.

In September 2018, Bachelet criticized the Saudi Arabian-led intervention in Yemen. She has called on Saudi Arabia to hold accountable those responsible for airstrikes on civilians in Yemen.

On 5 October 2019, Bachelet said she was "troubled by the high levels of violence associated with some demonstrations" during the 2019–20 Hong Kong protests, and stressed that any measures to quell the unrest must be grounded in law. She also stated that "Freedom of peaceful assembly … should be enjoyed without restriction to the greatest extent possible. But on the other hand, we cannot accept people who use masks to provoke violence."

Regarding the November 2019 Iranian protests, Nasrin Sotoudeh, a jailed Iranian lawyer, asked Bachelet to administrate an independent investigation into the alleged atrocities committed by the Iranian security forces in the uprising.

In January 2020, Bachelet has issued a report on Israeli settlements in the Occupied Palestinian Territory and in the occupied Syrian Golan. This report said that "the establishment and expansion of settlements in the Occupied Palestinian Territory amounts to the transfer by Israel of its population into the Occupied Palestinian Territory, which is prohibited under international humanitarian law. The transfer of an occupying Power’s population to a territory it occupies amounts to a war crime that may engage the individual criminal responsibility of those involved. A number of international bodies have confirmed the illegality of Israeli settlements in the Occupied Palestinian Territory and the occupied Syrian Golan, including the International Court of Justice, the Security Council, the General Assembly and the Human Rights Council."

During the COVID-19 pandemic, Bachelet asked the United States to suspend its sanctions regimes as way to help alleviate the pandemic's impact on the people of sanctioned countries.

On 9 October 2020, Bachelet expressed concern about the suffering of civilians during the Nagorno-Karabakh conflict between Armenia and Azerbaijan.

In January 2021, in preparation for the 2021 spring session of the UN Human Rights Council, Bachelet has issued a report on Sri Lanka. The report criticizes the failure of the current Sri Lankan government to address documented accusations of grave and numerous human rights crimes perpetrated during and after the Civil war in Sri Lanka, even though the war ended in 2009.

In February 2022, Bachelet report on Human rights situation in the Occupied Palestinian Territory said that "there are serious concerns that steps taken thus far by Israel and the Palestinian authorities to investigate alleged violations of international humanitarian law during the escalation of hostilities in May 2021 have not been sufficient" and "there was an almost total failure to ensure accountability for numerous allegations of the excessive use of force by Israeli forces in the context of law enforcement operations in the Occupied Palestinian Territory, resulting in the killing and injury of Palestinians. With regard to the Palestinian authorities, few steps were documented in the investigation and prosecution of members of Palestinian security forces or of the security forces in Gaza responsible for the alleged excessive use of force and other human rights violations committed against Palestinians".

Bachelet's visited Xinjiang in May 2022 which marked the first time in 17 years that a UN high commissioner for human rights had travelled to China. Bachelet's statement following the visit praised China's "[p]overty alleviation and the eradication of extreme poverty, 10 years ahead of its target date" as "tremendous achievements," noting also that China's "introduction of universal health care and almost universal unemployment insurance scheme go a long way in ensuring protection of the right to health and broader social and economic rights." Bachelet stated that in Xinjiang she "raised questions and concerns about the application of counter-terrorism and de-radicalisation measures and their broad application – particularly their impact on the rights of Uyghurs and other predominantly Muslim minorities" and that "the Government assured me that the [Vocational and Educational Training Center] system has been dismantled." She also "encouraged the Government to undertake a review of all counter terrorism and deradicalization policies to ensure they fully comply with international human rights standards, and in particular that they are not applied in an arbitrary and discriminatory way."

Bachelet's visit was criticized by organizations such as Amnesty International, Human Rights Watch, the Campaign for Uyghurs, and the World Uyghur Congress. The New York Times described Bachelet's comments regarding Xinjiang as "couched in the language of the Chinese government" and the editorial boards of The Guardian and The Washington Post criticized the visit.

On 13 June 2022, Bachelet announced that she would not seek a second term as UN High Commissioner on Human Rights following the expiration of her term on 31 August 2022. She said the decision was motivated by her desire to spend more time with her family in Chile and was unrelated to her recently concluded trip to Xinjiang. According to Al Jazeera, the United Nation’s Human Rights Office is politically charged and nearly all its high commissioners have avoided seeking term extensions. In her final brief at the UN's summer session, Bachelet touched on a number of issues, including the work her office was doing to provide an updated assessment on the human rights situation in Xinjiang and supporting calls for investigation into Israel's alleged killing of journalist Shireen Abu Akleh, stating that the "now chronically high levels of killings and injuries of Palestinians, including children by Israeli forces in the occupied Palestinian territory, have continued in the first six months of 2022.” Bachelet's report on Xinjiang was published on her final day in the role of high commissioner, but unusually she did not sign off on the report with her signature.

Awards and media recognition 
Ranked 17th most powerful women in the world by Forbes magazine in 2006 (she was No. 22 in 2009, No. 25 in 2008, and No. 27 in 2007.) As of 2014, she was ranked 25th.
Defense of Freedom and Democracy Award by Ramón Rubial Foundation (January 2007).
Ranked world's 15th most influential person by TIME magazine in 2008.
Shalom Award by the World Jewish Congress (June 2008).
Maximum Leadership Award (Argentina, October 2008).
Global Trailblazer Award by Vital Voices (October 2008).
South American Football Honorary Order of Merit in the Extraordinary Great Collar degree by CONMEBOL in July 2009. She is the first woman to receive such recognition.
Keys to the City of Lisbon (December 2009)
Woman of the Bicentenary at the 2010 Energy of Woman Awards by Chilectra (April 2010).
Federation of Progressive Women's International Prize (Spain, November 2010).
Keys to the City of Miami (November 2010).
The Association of Bi-National Chambers of Commerce in Florida's 2010 Award for Leadership in Global Trade (November 2010).
Member, Inter-American Dialogue (since 2010)
Washington Office on Latin America's Human Rights Award (November 2010).
Women's eNews' Newsmaker of the Decade Award (May 2011).
Ministry of Defense of Argentina's first Generala Juana Azurduy Award (April 2012).
Eisenhower Fellowships's Eisenhower Medal for Leadership and Service (May 2012).
2012 – "10 Most Influential Ibero American Intellectuals" of the year – Foreign Policy magazine
She was recognized as one of the BBC's 100 women of 2017.

Honorary degrees
University of Brasilia (April 2006).
Universidad de San Carlos de Guatemala (May 2007).
University of Essex (April 2008).
Pompeu Fabra University (May 2010).
National University of Córdoba (June 2010).
Catholic University of Córdoba (June 2010).
Universidad Internacional Menéndez Pelayo (September 2010).
Universidad Autónoma de Santo Domingo (November 2010).
University of Paris III: Sorbonne Nouvelle (November 2010).
Columbia University (May 2012).
Freiberg University of Mining and Technology (October 2014).
Katholieke Universiteit Leuven (June 2015).
University of Évora (March 2017).

Styles, honours and arms

National honours
 Grand Master (2006-2010/2014-2018) and Collar of the Order of Merit
 Grand Master (2006-2010/2014-2018) and Collar of the Order of Bernardo O'Higgins

Foreign honours
 Honorary Companion of the Order of Australia, Australia (5 October 2012).
 Grand Collar of the National Order of San Lorenzo, Ecuador (2010)
 Grand Cross with Chain of the Order of Merit of the Republic of Hungary, Hungary (2008)
 Knight Grand Cross with Collar of the Order of Merit of the Italian Republic, Italy (9 October 2007).
 Grand Cross with Collar of the Order of the White Rose of Finland (2007)
 Grand Cross with Golden Chain of the Order of Vytautas the Great, Lithuania (23 July 2008).
 Honorary Recipient of the Order of the Crown of the Realm, Malaysia (2009)
 Collar of the Order of the Aztec Eagle, Mexico (2007)
 Dame Grand Cross of the Order of the Netherlands Lion, The Netherlands (25 May 2009)
 Grand Collar of the Order of Prince Henry, Portugal (7 November 2007)
 Grand Cross of the Order of Christ, Portugal (1 December 2009)
 Grand Collar of the Order of Liberty, Portugal (30 March 2017)
 Collar of the Order of Isabella the Catholic, Spain (26 February 2010).
 Collar of the Order of Charles III, Spain (30 October 2014).
 Member of Royal Order of the Seraphim, Sweden (10 May 2016). Received on her state visit to Sweden.
 Collar of the Order of the Liberator
 Medal of the Oriental Republic of Uruguay (2006).

Arms

Documentaries
Michelle Bachelet – Symbol des neuen Chile (Ebbo Demant/SWR, 2004)
La hija del General ["The General's Daughter"] (María Elena Wood/2006)

Publications
Bachelet, Michelle. 2002. Los estudios comparados y la relación civil-militar. "Reflexiones tras una década de consolidación democrática en Chile", Revista Fuerzas Armadas y Sociedad, 17(4): 29–35.

References

Further reading

External links

Official presidential campaign site 
Biography by CIDOB Foundation 

"The woman taking Chile's top job" (BBC News)
"The unexpected travails of the woman who would be president" (The Economist, 8 December 2005)
"Bachelet's citizens' democracy" (The Economist, 10 March 2006)
"With a New Leader, Chile Seems to Shuck Its Strait Laces" (The New York Times, 8 March 2006)
"Welcome Madam Chilean President to Washington"  (Council on Hemispheric Affairs, 7 June 2006)

1951 births
Living people
Articles containing video clips
BBC 100 Women
Candidates for President of Chile
Chilean agnostics
Chilean exiles
Chilean feminists
Chilean former marxists
Chilean Ministers of Defense
Chilean Ministers of Health
Chilean people of Basque descent
Chilean people of English descent
Chilean people of French descent
Chilean people of Greek descent
Chilean people of Spanish descent
Chilean people of Swiss descent
Chilean expatriates in Germany
Chilean torture victims
Chilean women physicians
Collars of the Order of Isabella the Catholic
Chilean public health doctors
Chilean expatriates in East Germany
Female defence ministers
Female heads of government
Female heads of state
Government ministers of Chile
Grand Crosses with Golden Chain of the Order of Vytautas the Great
Honorary Companions of the Order of Australia
Knights Grand Cross of the Order of Merit of the Italian Republic
Liceo Javiera Carrera alumni
Members of the Inter-American Dialogue
Politicians from Santiago
Presidents of Chile
Presidents pro tempore of the Union of South American Nations
Socialist Party of Chile politicians
United Nations High Commissioners for Human Rights
University of Chile alumni
Westland Middle School alumni
Women government ministers of Chile
Women pediatricians
Women presidents
Women public health doctors